Main Post Office may refer to:

United States
 Old Athens, Alabama Main Post Office, in Athens, Alabama
 United States Post Office (Basin, Wyoming), in Basin, Wyoming
 Beaver Main Post Office, in Beaver, Utah
 Beverly Hills Main Post Office, in Beverly Hills, California
 United States Post Office–Blackfoot Main, in Blackfoot, Idaho
 Buffalo Main Post Office, in Buffalo, Wyoming
 Old Chicago Main Post Office, in Chicago, Illinois
 United States Post Office (Douglas, Wyoming), in Douglas, Wyoming
 Elko Main Post Office, in Elko, Nevada
 Evanston Main Post Office, in Evanston, Wyoming
 United States Post Office and Courthouse–Glasgow Main, in Glasgow, Montana
 Glendale Main Post Office, in Glendale, California
 United States Post Office and Courthouse–Globe Main, in Globe, Arizona
 United States Post Office (Greenwich, Connecticut), in Greenwich, Connecticut
 United States Post Office (Greybull, Wyoming), in Greybull, Wyoming
 United States Post Office and Courthouse–Havre Main, in Havre, Montana
 Lewiston Main Post Office, in Lewiston, Maine
 United States Post Office and Courthouse–Littleton Main, in Littleton, New Hampshire
 Long Beach Main Post Office, in Long Beach, California
 United States Post Office–Meriden Main, in Meriden, Connecticut
 Miles City Main Post Office, in Miles City, Montana,
 New Brunswick Main Post Office, in New Brunswick, New Jersey
 United States Post Office–New London Main, in New London, Connecticut
 United States Post Office (Newcastle, Wyoming), in Newcastle, Wyoming
 Main Post Office and Federal Building (Oakland, California), listed on the NRHP in Alameda County
 Oconto Main Post Office, in Oconto, Wisconsin, listed on the NRHP in Oconto County
 United States Post Office (Palm Beach, Florida), in Palm Beach, Florida
 U.S. Post Office-Peterborough Main, in Peterborough, New Hampshire
 United States Post Office and Courthouse–Prescott Main, in Prescott, Arizona
 Reno Main Post Office, in Reno, Nevada
 United States Post Office (Somersworth, New Hampshire), in Somersworth, New Hampshire
 United States Post Office–Stamford Main, in Stamford, Connecticut
 Thermopolis Main Post Office, in Thermopolis, Wyoming
 Tonopah Main Post Office, in Tonopah, Nevada
 United States Post Office (Willows, California), in Willows, California
 Winnemucca Main Post Office, in Winnemucca, Nevada
 United States Post Office (Yellowstone National Park), in Yellowstone National Park, Wyoming

Other countries
 General Post Office, Belgrade, in Belgrade, Serbia
 Bremen Main Post Office Building, in Bremen, Germany
 Main Post Office, Bydgoszcz, in Bydgoszcz, Poland
 Grand Post Office, in Istanbul, Turkey
 Main Post Office, Kraków, in Kraków, Poland